Vostochny Okrug may refer to:
Eastern Administrative Okrug (Vostochny administrativny okrug), an administrative okrug of Moscow, Russia
Vostochny Administrative Okrug, Tyumen, a division of the city of Tyumen, Russia
Vostochny Okrug, Belgorod, a division of the city of Belgorod, Russia